Stanečka Vas ( or) is a settlement in the Municipality of Majšperk in northeastern Slovenia. It lies on the left bank of the Dravinja River on the regional road leading from Majšperk to Jurovci. The area is part of the traditional region of Styria. It is currently included with the rest of the municipality in the Drava Statistical Region.

References

External links
Stanečka Vas at Geopedia

Populated places in the Municipality of Majšperk